Serafina Steer (born 30 April 1982) is an English harpist, pianist, singer and songwriter.

Early life and education 
Steer is the daughter of composer Michael Maxwell Steer and stage designer Deirdre Clancy. She started learning the harp at age seven and graduated from Trinity College of Music with first-class honours.

Career 
In 2007 Steer released a 7" single and an album entitled Cheap Demo Bad Science on Static Caravan records. Some tracks were recorded and produced in collaboration with Mike Lindsay of folktronica band Tunng, while some were recorded with Kristian Robinson, aka Capitol K. The album opens with a cover version of Brian Eno's "By This River" but all other songs are her own.

In 2010 she released Change is Good, Change is Good, again on Static Caravan. It was described by Jarvis Cocker as one of his favourite albums of the year and well "worth a listen". Recording was interrupted when Steer's harp was stolen from her car. Benge made his collection of analogue synthesizers available to fill in the harp parts. Patrick Wolf described the album in The Observer as if "Stereolab and Shirley Collins made an album together about the trials of 21st-century romance."

Later in 2010, Steer recorded the Bloody Hell EP with Paul Jones of Stolen Recordings. The EP features three songs from Change is Good, Change is Good and two new songs, and includes the art work of Polly Huggett and RWM Hunt. These unadorned "live" harp and voice recordings were intended as a watermark, after months without an instrument and then with a new make of harp.

Her latest album is The Moths Are Real. It is out on Stolen Recordings. It was produced by Jarvis Cocker .

Collaborations 
Steer has appeared both live and on record with musicians including Patrick Wolf, Tunng, Capitol K, Cibelle, the Memory Band, Balearic Folk Orchestra, James Yorkston, Adem, Chrome Hoof, Shimmy Rivers and Canal, Leafcutter John, Simon Bookish, and Seb Rochford. She has also worked with Jarvis Cocker and Bat for Lashes.

She has also performed with her brother Sam Steer, who did the animation for the music video of her song "Tiger" in his room in Camberwell. The Branchage Film Festival, Jersey, recently commissioned Steer to compose a live soundtrack to a film of her choosing. Steer and her brother are working with PRS Women Make Music funding to create a psychedelic harp and stop-motion animation response to Kenneth Anger's Rabbit's Moon, called Postman's Familiar.

In 2010 and 2011 Steer joined John Foxx and the Maths for live concerts in London playing analogue synthesizers and bass guitar. In 2012 she appeared in the London Sinfonietta's New Music Show 3.

In 2013 she performed with Patrick Wolf at Manchester Pride.

In 2015, she formed a new band, Bas Jan. Bas Jan released their first album Yes I Jan in 2018.

Discography

Studio albums 
Cheap Demo Bad Science, 2007, Static Caravan
Change is Good, Change is Good, 2010, Static Caravan
The Moths Are Real, 2013, Stolen Recordings
The Mind is a Trap, 2019, Vitamin Concept Records

EPs 
Japan Tour EP, 2006, Static Caravan
Public Spirited, 2008, Static Caravan
Bloody Hell, 2010, Stolen Recordings

Singles 
"Peach Heart" / "Mano E Mano", 2007, Static Caravan

Compilations 
The Ground Bellow Me (Capitol K version of "Seven Bridge"), 2006 from Utrophia 03 Utrophia
Cheap Demo Bad Science ("They Came From The Stars, I Saw Them" version) 2007, 93 Free CDs
Uncomfortable (Capitol K version), 2007, Stolen Comp, Stolen Recordings

References 

1982 births
Alumni of Trinity College of Music
Living people
English harpists
English women pianists
English songwriters
Singers from London
Women harpists
21st-century English women singers
21st-century English singers
21st-century pianists
John Foxx and the Maths members
21st-century women pianists